The Prix Django Reinhardt is an award granted by the French Académie du Jazz for the best French jazz musician of the year. It is named after Django Reinhardt. The prize is determined by a jury of jazz journalists, producers, and musicians.

In 2006 the double CD 50 ans Prix Django Reinhardt (with booklet) was released for the prize's 50th anniversary.

Winners

 2017: Fred Nardin
 2016: Paul Lay
 2015: Airelle Besson
 2012: Émile Parisien
 2011: Nguyên Lê
 2010: Sylvain Luc
 2009: Stéphane Guillaume
 2008: Médéric Collignon, Géraldine Laurent
 2007: Pierre Christophe
 2006: Pierrick Pedron
 2005: François Moutin, Louis Moutin
 2004: Pierre de Bethmann
 2003: Jacky Terrasson
 2002: Bojan Zulfikarpašić (Bojan Z)
 2001: Baptiste Trotignon
 2000: Jean-Michel Pilc
 1999: Sophia Domancich
 1998: Manuel Rocheman
 1997: Daniel Huck
 1996: Simon Goubert
 1995: Emmanuel Bex
 1994: Lionel Belmondo, Stéphane Belmondo
 1993: Laurent de Wilde, Sylvain Beuf
 1992: Richard Galliano
 1991: Jean-Loup Longnon
 1990: Hervé Sellin
 1989: Laurent Cugny
 1988: Louis Sclavis
 1987: Marc Ducret
 1986: Zool Fleischer
 1985: Antoine Hervé
 1984: Marc Bertaux
 1983: Éric Le Lann
 1982: Michel Petrucciani
 1981: François Couturier
 1980: François Jeanneau
 1979: Alain Jean-Marie
 1978: Michel Graillier
 1977: Henri Texier
 1976: Christian Escoudé
 1975: Joseph Dejean
 1974: Jean-François Jenny-Clark
 1973: Alby Cullaz
 1972: Bernard Lubat
 1971: Ivan Jullien
 1970: François Guin
 1969: Michel Roques
 1968: Michel Portal
 1967: Jean-Luc Ponty
 1966: Gilbert Rovère
 1965: Jean-Louis Chautemps
 1964: Eddy Louiss
 1963: Pierre Michelot
 1962: Maurice Vander
 1961: René Urtreger 
 1960: Georges Arvanitas
 1959: Roger Guérin
 1958: Barney Wilen
 1957: Christian Chevallier 
 1956: Martial Solal
 1955: Guy Lafitte

Jazz awards
French music awards
Awards established in 1955
1955 establishments in France